Les Bidasses en folie is a French comedy film directed by Claude Zidi released in 1971.

Plot 
Five catastrophe-prone friends—Gérard, Phil, Jean-Guy, Jean and Luis—decide to leave home and start a rock band.  They find a supporter in Crème, a young woman who runs a musical instruments shop and believes in them. She enters them in a battle of the bands which turns out to be rigged, but they win despite unleashing mayhem on stage when she cheats on their behalf.

Unfortunately for them, the young men are then called up for their military service.  In order to be able to take part in the next competition, they set about being kicked out by being as incompetent and uncooperative as they can be.  Their musical talents are however put to use by their commanding officer, who requisitions them to play his daughter's wedding reception.  Eventually, the colonel kicks them out with the exception of Gérard, whom he decides to keep as his aide.  The other four, briefly delighted to be out, return for him.

Cast 
 Gérard Rinaldi ... Gérard 
 Gérard Filipelli ... Phil
 Jean Sarrus ... Jean
 Luis Rego ... Luis
 Jean-Guy Fechner ... Jean-Guy
 Jacques Dufilho ... colonel
 Jacques Seiler ... Sergeant Bellec
 Marion Game ... Crème
 Martin Circus ... themselves
 Triangle ... themselves
 Christian Fechner ... customer at the restaurant
 Francis Lemaire ... fiancé of the colonel's daughter

See also 
 Lists of highest-grossing films in France

External links
 

1971 comedy films
1971 films
French comedy films
Military humor in film
Films directed by Claude Zidi
1971 directorial debut films
1970s French films